Douglas is a rural locality in the Toowoomba Region, Queensland, Australia.

Geography 
The Pechey-Maclagan Road runs through the locality from east to west.

The predominant land use is grazing on native vegetation and crop growing.

History 

German settlers arrived in the district in 1875. A Lutheran congregation formed and worshipped in private homes, until the Jesus Lutheran Church was opened on 24 July 1882 on the Douglas Plainby Road. The church was enlarged in 1938. 

On 21 December 1886, the Queensland Government reserved a  site for a cemetery. A section for Lutheran burials was created in the north-west of the site and a section for Catholic burials in the south.

Gomoron Provisional School opened on 28 February 1887. It was most likely named after Gomaren Creek which flows through the area. It became Goromon State School in 1890. In 1911, its name was changed to Douglas State School, to avoid post office confusion as there was another place called Gomaren. The school closed in 1959. It was at Douglas Plainby Road (corner Guy Road).

Pastor Wilhelm Georg Friedrich Poland was the Lutheran minister in Douglas from 1910 until his retirement in 1933. During World War I, he was interned at Trial Bay Gaol as an enemy alien.

In 1992, the Jesus Lutheran church building was relocated to be the chapel at the Ballon Outdoor Education Centre  in the Barakula State Forest in Durah (Western Downs Region), operated by Concordia Lutheran College in Toowoomba. In 2019, it was relocated to the Googa Outdoor Education Centre, operated by a number of Lutheran organisations, in the Googa State Forest on Nukku Road at Googa Creek (Townsville Region). The site of the church in Douglas is marked with a small monument.

Economy
There are a number of homesteads in the locality, including:
 Greyhurst
 Hillview
 Ky-Lew
 Nargoor
 Yavrabee

Education
There are no schools in Douglas. The nearest government primary school is Goombungee State School in neighbouring Goombungee to the west and Haden State School in Haden to the north-west. The nearest government secondary schools are Crows Nest State School (to Year 10) in Crows Nest to the north-east and Highfields State Secondary College (to Year 12) in Highfields to the south-east.

Facilities
Douglas Cemetery is on Douglas Plainby Road. It is operated by the Toowoomba Regional Council.

References 

Toowoomba Region
Localities in Queensland